D. D. T. Moore Farmhouse is a historic home located at Loudonville in Albany County, New York.  It was built in 1850 and is a -story, Colonial style frame dwelling.  Porches were added and general renovations occurred during the 1890s.

It was listed on the National Register of Historic Places in 1979.

References

Houses on the National Register of Historic Places in New York (state)
Houses completed in 1850
Houses in Albany County, New York
National Register of Historic Places in Albany County, New York